Randall Evan Stonehill (born March 12, 1952) is an American singer and songwriter from Stockton, California, best known as one of the pioneers of contemporary Christian music. His music is primarily folk rock in the style of James Taylor, but some of his albums have focused on new wave, pop, pop rock, roots rock, and children's music.

Early life
Randy Stonehill was born in Stockton, California. the son of Leonard N. Stonehill  and his wife, Pauline Correia and is the younger brother of Jeffrey Dean Stonehill.

He graduated from Leigh High School, in San Jose, California, then moved to Los Angeles where he stayed with Christian rock singer, Larry Norman.

Career 
Stonehill's first album, Born Twice was released in 1971, with financial help from Pat Boone. The album—one side a live performance, the other recorded in a studio—was recorded for a mere $US 800, and according to Stonehill, "sounds like every penny of it."

A year later, Stonehill made his film acting debut in The Blob sequel, Beware! The Blob (also known as Son of Blob), with Cindy Williams, in which he performed the unreleased song "Captain Coke". He also made a cameo appearance in the 1973 Billy Graham film Time to Run, performing his song "I Love You".

In 1976, Stonehill released the Larry Norman-produced Welcome to Paradise, for which Andy Johns did the engineering. This became a landmark album for the songwriter and was voted the "third most important contemporary Christian album" in a mid-1980s poll of Christian music critics.

In the late 1970s, Stonehill joined forces with rock band Daniel Amos for the "Amos 'n' Randy Tour". Daniel Amos went on to be Stonehill's band for his next two releases, and Stonehill later provided backing vocals on a number of Daniel Amos' projects.

1984's Celebrate This Heartbeat teamed Stonehill with longtime friend Phil Keaggy for the song "Who Will Save The Children?" In 1989 they formed The Keaggy/Stonehill Band with Daniel Amos bassist Tim Chandler and The Swirling Eddies' David Raven on drums. Keaggy and Stonehill also teamed up several other times, both live in concert and in the studio.  They recorded and performed as Phil Keaggy and Sunday's Child in 1988.  They also joined singer Margaret Becker, drummer Joe English (former member of Paul McCartney and Wings) and several others that same year for the Compassion All Star Band's album One by One.

Marriages and family
Stonehill has been married three times, to Sarah Mae Finch, Sandra Jean Warner, and Leslie Sealander, with the first two marriages ending in divorce. His second marriage produced one daughter, Heather. Finch later married Larry Norman.

Discography 
 Born Twice, 1971 debut album
 Get Me Out of Hollywood, recorded 1973, not officially released until 1999
 Welcome to Paradise, 1976, produced by Larry Norman
 The Sky Is Falling, recorded 1977, released 1980, produced by Larry Norman
 Between the Glory and the Flame, 1981, produced by Terry Scott Taylor
 Equator, 1983, produced by Terry Scott Taylor
 Celebrate This Heartbeat, 1984, produced by Barry Miller Kaye
 Stonehill, 1984 EP, produced by Barry Miller Kaye
 Love Beyond Reason, 1985, produced by Barry Miller Kaye
 The Wild Frontier, 1986, produced by Dave Perkins
 Can't Buy a Miracle, 1988, produced by Dave Perkins
 Return to Paradise, 1989, produced by Mark Heard
 Until We Have Wings, 1990 studio/live album, produced by Mark Heard
 Wonderama, 1991, produced by Terry Scott Taylor
 Stories, 1993 compilation, with 3 new tracks produced by Terry Scott Taylor
 Lazarus Heart, 1994, produced by Jimmie Lee Sloas
 Our Recollections, 1996 compilation
 Thirst, 1998, produced by Rick Elias
 Uncle Stonehill's Hat Uncle Stonehill, 2001 children's album produced by Terry Scott Taylor
 Edge of the World, 2002, produced by Bob Kilpatrick and Stonehill
 Together Live!, 2006 live album recorded with Phil Keaggy
 Touchstone, 2007
 Paradise Sky, 2008, produced by Randy Stonehill and Mike Pachelli
 Mystery Highway, 2009, produced by Phil Keaggy and Randy Stonehill
 Spirit Walk, 2011, produced by Mike Pachelli and Randy Stonehill
 Stonehill and Storm – Breath of God, 2013, produced by Buck Storm
 Lost Art of Listening, 2020

Compilations and productions
 Time to Run, Original Motion Picture Soundtrack, 1973 album, produced by Anthony Harris (Stonehill performs on three tracks)
 Strong Hand of Love, tribute to Mark Heard, 1994
 Orphans of God, tribute to Mark Heard, 1996
 First Love: a Historic Gathering of Jesus Music Pioneers, Jesus Movement artist reunion album, 1998
 Surfonic Water Revival, tribute to surf music, 1998
 When Worlds Collide: A Tribute to Daniel Amos, Daniel Amos tribute album, 1999
 Making God Smile: An Artists' Tribute to the Songs of Beach Boy Brian Wilson, Brian Wilson tribute album, 2002
 There's a Rainbow Somewhere: The Songs of Randy Stonehill, Randy Stonehill tribute album, 2022

Videography
 Beware! The Blob (also known as Son of Blob). Motion Picture, 1972.
 Time to Run, World Wide Pictures. Motion Picture, 1973
 Love Beyond Reason: The Video Album, VHS, 1985
 One Night In 20 Years, anniversary live concert, VHS, 1990
 First Love: An Historic Gathering of Artists from the Jesus Movement, Volume 2, VHS, 1998; Re-released on DVD, 2005
 Together Live in concert with Phil Keaggy, DVD, 2006
 Fallen Angel: The Outlaw Larry Norman. Documentary, 2009

Works
 "Married Strangers", Christianity Today (Spring 1999)

References

Further reading
 McNeil, W.K. "Stonehill, Randy", in Encyclopedia of American Gospel Music (Routledge, 2005):377–378.

References 
 Official site
 Randy Stonehill interviews 1978–1998

American performers of Christian music
Musicians from San Jose, California
1952 births
Living people
American male guitarists
American male singers
American male songwriters
Larry Norman
Myrrh Records artists
Songwriters from California
Singers from California
Guitarists from California
20th-century American guitarists